Mohort may refer to:

Mohort, an 1855 poem by Wincenty Pol
Julian Mohort, pen name of Polish poet Julian Ochorowicz
Irena Mohort, a lead character of the 1938 Polish film Second Youth

See also
 Mohor (TV series), an Indian Bengali television soap opera

Polish-language surnames